BigHit Series are video games for the Korean Sony PlayStation 2, PlayStation 3 and PlayStation Portable consoles that have been officially re-released at a lower price by Sony and third parties that meet specific criteria. While the term "BigHit series" only applies to selections in South Korea, equivalent programs exist in North America (as "Greatest Hits"), PAL territories (as "Essentials") and Japan and Asia (as "The Best").

History
The BigHit Series program was first released for PlayStation 2 on October 1, 2004, by Sony Computer Entertainment Korea (SCEK) for games that were distributed in South Korea. SCEK's official press release on September 30, 2004, stated (modified translation) that users of the PlayStation 2 hardware in Korea for the first time can purchase popular classic PlayStation 2 games, and enjoy them at an affordable cost; helping users to an existing genre preference due to several issues of being out-of-stock, or the user did not try the game.

All BigHit Series games were released at the price of 26,800KRW. Historically exchange rates dating back to October 2004 show that was slightly above US$23.25 (US$1 ~= 1147 KRW)

The translated press release by SCEK suggests that there might have been 6 games already released to PlayStation 2 owners in June of the same year; leading to 15 BigHit series games being released by the start of October 2004. The first 7 - 15 games released under the BigHit series title were : Minna no Golf 3, Gitaroo Man, Time Crisis 3, The Lord of the Rings: Return of the King, Need for Speed: Underground, SSX 3, WWE Smackdown! Shut Your Mouth, Final Fantasy X International, and Shin Sangoku Musō 2.

List of titles

PlayStation 2

Ace Combat 5: The Unsung War
Ace Combat Zero: The Belkan War
Ape Escape 3
Dark Chronicle
Dark Cloud
Devil May Cry 3
Disgaea: Hour of Darkness
Drakengard 2
Dynasty Warriors 3
Dynasty Warriors 4
Dynasty Warriors 5
EyeToy: Monkey Mania
EyeToy: Play
Fatal Frame
Fatal Frame II: Crimson Butterfly
Final Fantasy XII
Final Fantasy X
Genji: Dawn of the Samurai
Gitaroo Man
God of War
God of War II
Gran Turismo 4
Gran Turismo Concept
Hot Shots Golf 3
Hot Shots Golf Fore!
Hot Shots Tennis
ICO
Jake Hunter
Katamari Damacy
Killzone
Mad Maestro!
Metal Gear Solid 2: Sons of Liberty
Metal Gear Solid 3: Snake Eater
Need for Speed: Underground
Onimusha: Dawn of Dreams
Persona 3 FES
Persona 4
Prince of Persia: The Sands of Time
Prince of Persia: The Two Thrones
Prince of Persia: Warrior Within
Raiden III
Ratchet & Clank: Going Commando
Ratchet & Clank: Up Your Arsenal
Ratchet: Deadlocked
Resident Evil 4
Romance of the Three Kingdoms IX
Samurai Warriors 3: Empires
Samurai Warriors 4: Empires
Sega Rally 2006
Shadow of the Colossus
Shadow of the Colossus
Shining Tears
Sly 2: Band of Thieves
Sly 3: Honor Among Thieves
Sly Cooper and the Thievius Raccoonus
SOCOM 3 U.S. Navy SEALs
SOCOM II U.S. Navy SEALs
Sonic Heroes
Sonic Mega Collection Plus
Sonic Riders
SSX 3
SSX Tricky
Street Fighter Anniversary Collection
Tales of Destiny 2
Tales of Legendia
Tekken 4
Tekken 5
Tekken Tag Tournament
The Lord of the Rings: Return of the King
Time Crisis 3
Viewtiful Joe
Virtua Fighter 4 Evolution
WWE SmackDown! Here Comes the Pain
WWE SmackDown! Shut Your Mouth
WWE Smackdown vs. Raw 2007
WWE Smackdown vs. Raw 2008
We Love Katamari
Yakuza
Zone of the Enders: The 2nd Runner

PlayStation 3

Ace Combat: Assault Horizon
Agarest Senki
Akiba's Trip: Undead & Undressed
Armored Core: For Answer
Atelier Meruru: The Apprentice of Arland
Atelier Rorona: The Alchemist of Arland
Atelier Totori: The Adventurer of Arland
Battlefield: Bad Company 2
Bayonetta
BlazBlue: Calamity Trigger
Call of Duty 4: Modern Warfare
Cross Edge
Devil May Cry 4
Dragon's Dogma
Dynasty Warriors 7
Everybody's Golf 5
FIFA 11
Final Fantasy XIII
Folklore
God of War III
Hakuna Matata
Infamous
Killzone 2
Lair
LittleBigPlanet
Metal Gear Solid 4: Guns of the Patriots
Mobile Suit Gundam: Extreme Vs.
Naruto Shippuden: Ultimate Ninja Storm 2
Naruto: Ultimate Ninja Storm
Ninja Gaiden Sigma
Pro Evolution Soccer 2009
Pro Evolution Soccer 2010
Pro Evolution Soccer 2011
Pro Evolution Soccer 2013
Ratchet & Clank Future: Tools of Destruction
Resident Evil 5
Resistance 2
Resistance: Fall of Man
Ridge Racer 7
Sengoku Basara 4
Sengoku Basara: Samurai Heroes
Sengoku Basara
Soulcalibur IV
Street Fighter IV
Super Street Fighter IV
Tales of Graces f
Tales of Vesperia
Tekken 6
The Idolmaster One For All
Tom Clancy's Ghost Recon Advanced Warfighter 2
Tom Clancy's Rainbow Six: Vegas 2
Trinity Universe
Uncharted 2: Among Thieves
Uncharted: Drake's Fortune
Virtua Fighter 5
Yakuza 3

PlayStation Portable

Ace Combat X: Skies of Deception
Disgaea: Hour of Darkness
Dissidia Final Fantasy
Dragon Ball Z: Shin Budokai 2
Innocent Life
Katamari Damacy
Kingdom of Paradise
LocoRoco
Lost Regnum: Makutsu no Koutei
Monster Hunter Portable 3rd
Patapon
Patapon 2
Persona 3 Portable
Ridge Racers
Ridge Racers 2
SD Gundam G Generation World
SOCOM U.S. Navy SEALs: Fireteam Bravo
Sengoku Basara
Talkman
Tekken 5
Tekken 6
Untold Legends: The Warrior's Code
Valkyrie Profile: Lenneth

PlayStation Vita

Akiba's Trip: Undead & Undressed
God Eater 2
Gravity Rush
Muramasa: The Demon Blade
Persona 4 Golden
Ragnarok Odyssey
Ragnarok Odyssey ACE
Steins;Gate
Steins;Gate 0

References

External links
 Official Sony Computer Entertainment Korea BigHit Series list
 Official Sony Computer Entertainment Korea Press Releases

Budget ranges
PlayStation (console)
PlayStation 2 games
PlayStation (console) games
 
PlayStation 3 games
PlayStation (brand)
PlayStation (brand)-related lists